Barnett Cohen (1891–1952) was a Russian Empire-born American bacteriologist who performed the first ultra-microscopic surgeries, including on amoeba.

Cohen received his Ph.D. from Yale University. He was president of the Society of American Bacteriologists, and a member of the American Association for the Advancement of Science,
the American Chemical Society, and American Public Health Association.

References

External links
 

1891 births
1952 deaths
Emigrants from the Russian Empire to the United States
Yale University alumni
American bacteriologists